Amongst Indian chess players there are 76 Grandmasters (GM); 124 International Masters (IM); 18 Woman Grandmasters (WGM), including some who also hold the higher IM title; and 42 Woman International Masters (WIM) as of January 2021, according to FIDE, the International Chess Federation.

As of January 2021, the top 10 active Indian chess players have an average rating of 2670, the 4th highest in the world, behind Russia, the United States, and China. The top 10 active women Indian players have an average rating of 2405, the 3rd highest in the world behind China and Russia.

As of 2020, 19 different players have been conferred with the highest civilian and sports honours of India, including the Padma awards and the Arjuna Award. Viswanathan Anand was the first sportsperson to receive the second-highest civilian award, Padma Vibhushan, in 2008 and the inaugural highest sports award, Rajiv Gandhi Khel Ratna (now called Major Dhyan Chand Khel Ratna Award), in 1991–92.

Top players
The list of top 10 active players as of October 2022. The top 100 players of the world include 4 Indian players, amongst them Viswanathan Anand at Rank 15. The top 100 women players of the world include 7 Indian players, amongst them Koneru Humpy at Rank 3.

Top junior players
The list of top 10 active junior (under the age of 20 as of 1 January of that year) players as of February 2023. The top 100 junior players of the world include 20 Indian players, among them Gukesh D at Rank 3, Arjun Erigaisi at Rank 5, Praggnanandhaa Rameshbabu at Rank 6 and Nihal Sarin at Rank 9. The top 100 junior girl players of the world include 10 Indian players, among them Savitha Shri B at Rank 4, Vantika Agarwal at Rank 10, Divya Deshmukh at Rank 12 and Priyanka Nutakki at Rank 24.

Decorated players
As of 2020, 19 different individuals have been conferred India's top civilian and sports awards. Five different individuals have been conferred the Padma awards. Anupama Gokhale was the first chess player to be awarded the Padma Shri at the age of 16 in 1986. Viswanathan Anand became the first sportsperson to receive the second highest civilian award, Padma Vibhushan, in 2008 after becoming the undisputed World Chess Champion in 2007.

Nineteen different individuals have received top sports honours of India as of 2020. Anand was the recipient of the inaugural highest sports award Rajiv Gandhi Khel Ratna in 1991–92. Seventeen individuals have been awarded the Arjuna Award for exceptional performance in chess at the international level. Manuel Aaron was the first chess player to receive this award in its inception year of 1961. Rohini Khadilkar was the second chess player and first female chess player to receive this award in 1980–81. In total, seven women chess players have received this award. Two chess coaches—including Raghunandan Gokhle (spouse of Anupama Gokhale) and Koneru Ashok (father and coach of Koneru Humpy)—have received the Dronacharya Award, the highest sports coaching honour of India.

Titled players 
As of June 2022, India has 75 Grandmasters (GM) including 2 female players holding the title, 125 International Masters (IM) including 6 female players holding the title, 18 Woman Grandmasters (WGM), 42 Woman International Masters (WIM) and a total of 33,028 rated players. Female rated players are 3,534 in number forming 10.7% of the total rated players of India. The first titled player of India was Manuel Aaron, when he became the first IM of India in 1961. Viswanathan Anand became India's first GM in 1988.

The first Indian to obtain WIM title was Jayshree Khadilkar in 1979 and WGM title was Subbaraman Vijayalakshmi in 2001. The first Indian woman to become GM was Koneru Humpy in 2002 and IM was Subbaraman Vijayalakshmi in 2002.

Grandmasters

{| class="wikitable nowrap sortable static-row-numbers"
! Name
! FIDE ID
! State
! Birth
! Year
! M/F
! Highest Rating
! Achieved
! class="unsortable"|Reference
|-
|  || 5000017 || Tamil Nadu
|  || 1988 || align=center | M || align=center | 2817
|  || 
|-
|  || 5000025 || West Bengal
|  || 1991 || align=center | M || align=center | 2561
|  || 
|-
|  || 5000033 || Maharashtra
|  || 1997 || align=center | M || align=center | 2515
|  || 
|-
|  || 5002265 || Maharashtra
|  || 2000 || align=center | M || align=center | 2568
|  || 
|-
|  || 5004985 || Tamil Nadu
|  || 2000 || align=center | M || align=center | 2720
|  || 
|-
|  || 5007003 || Andhra Pradesh
|  || 2001 || align=center | M || align=center | 2770
|  || 
|-
|  || 5008123 || Andhra Pradesh
|  || 2002 || align=center | F || align=center | 2623
|  || 
|-
|  || 5002150 || West Bengal
|  || 2003 || align=center | M || align=center | 2676
|  || title application
|-
|  || 5004225 || West Bengal
|  || 2003 || align=center | M || align=center | 2656
|  || 
|-
|  || 5002109 || Tamil Nadu
|  || 2003 || align=center | M || align=center | 2507
|  || 
|-
|  || 5004195 || Gujarat
|  || 2004 || align=center | M || align=center | 2530
|  || 
|-
|  || 5007429 || Tamil Nadu
|  || 2006 || align=center | M || align=center | 2586
|  || 
|-
|  || 5011132 || Tamil Nadu
|  || 2006 || align=center | M || align=center | 2557
|  || 
|-
|  || 5003512 || West Bengal
|  || 2006 || align=center | M || align=center | 2514
|  || 
|-
|  || 5016690 || Delhi
|  || 2006 || align=center | M || align=center | 2671
|  || 
|-
|  || 5015693 || Kerala
|  || 2007 || align=center | M || align=center | 2611
|  || title application
|-
|  || 5010608 || Delhi
|  || 2008 || align=center | M || align=center | 2667
|  || title application
|-
|  || 5011167 || Tamil Nadu
|  || 2008 || align=center | M || align=center | 2570
|  || title application
|-
|  || 5005370 || Tamil Nadu
|  || 2009 || align=center | M || align=center | 2526
|  || title application
|-
|  || 5005361 || Tamil Nadu
|  || 2009 || align=center | M || align=center | 2521
|  || title application
|-
|  || 5001668 || Delhi
|  || 2010 || align=center | M || align=center | 2511
|  || title application
|-
|  || 5008352 || West Bengal
|  || 2010 || align=center | M || align=center | 2596
|  || title application
|-
|  || 5018471 || Tamil Nadu
|  || 2010 || align=center | M || align=center | 2701
|  || title application
|-
|  || 5021596 || Tamil Nadu
|  || 2011 || align=center | M || align=center | 2673
|  || title application
|-
|  || 5015197 || Andhra Pradesh
|  || 2011 || align=center | F || align=center | 2543
|  || title application
|-
|  || 5024595 || Andhra Pradesh
|  || 2012 || align=center | M || align=center | 2594
|  || title application
|-
|  || 5045185 || Delhi
|  || 2012 || align=center | M || align=center | 2600
|  || title application
|-
|  || 5005779 || Tamil Nadu
|  || 2012 || align=center | M || align=center | 2528
|  || title application
|-
|  || 5021103 || Delhi
|  || 2012 || align=center | M || align=center | 2532
|  || title application
|-
|  || 5029465 || Maharashtra
|  || 2013 || align=center | M || align=center | 2727
|  || title application
|-
|  || 5019141 || Tamil Nadu
|  || 2013 || align=center | M || align=center | 2554
|  || title application
|-
|  || 5012414 || Maharashtra
|  || 2013 || align=center | M || align=center | 2512
|  || title application
|-
|  || 5030692 || Tamil Nadu
|  || 2013 || align=center | M || align=center | 2543
|  || title application
|-
|  || 5024854 || Odisha
|  || 2013 || align=center | M || align=center | 2548
|  || title application
|-
|  || 5008980 || West Bengal
|  || 2013 || align=center | M || align=center | 2500
|  || title application
|-
|  || 5023335 || Gujarat
|  || 2014 || align=center | M || align=center | 2511
|  || title application
|-
|  || 5072786 || Tamil Nadu
|  || 2015 || align=center | M || align=center | 2641
|  || title application
|-
|  || 5074452 || Tamil Nadu
|  || 2015 || align=center | M || align=center | 2637
|  || title application
|-
|  || 5018137 || Tamil Nadu
|  || 2015 || align=center | M || align=center | 2515
|  || title application
|-
|  || 5019184 || Maharashtra
|  || 2016 || align=center | M || align=center | 2545
|  || title application
|-
|  || 5058422 || Kerala
|  || 2016 || align=center | M || align=center | 2662
|  || title application
|-
|  || 5037883 || Maharashtra
|  || 2016 || align=center | M || align=center | 2521
|  || title application
|-
|  || 5045207 || West Bengal
|  || 2016 || align=center | M || align=center | 2581
|  || title application
|-
|  || 5018293 || Tamil Nadu
|  || 2016 || align=center | M || align=center | 2554
|  || title application
|-
|  || 5084423 || Delhi
|  || 2017 || align=center | M || align=center | 2627
|  || title application
|-
|  || 5018420 || Tamil Nadu
|  || 2017 || align=center | M || align=center | 2572
|  || title application
|-
|  || 5007836 || Haryana
|  || 2017 || align=center | M || align=center | 2514
|  || title application
|-
|  || 5024366 || Goa
|  || 2017 || align=center | M || align=center | 2504
|  || title application
|-
|  || 5061245 || Maharashtra
|  || 2017 || align=center | M || align=center | 2618
|  || title application
|-
|  || 5009154 || Karnataka
|  || 2017 || align=center | M || align=center | 2500
|  || title application
|-
|  || 5002974 || West Bengal
|  || 2018 || align=center | M || align=center | 2500
|  || title application
|-
|  || 25059530 || Tamil Nadu
|  || 2018 || align=center | M || align=center | 2661
|  || title application
|-
|  || 25092340 || Kerala
|  || 2018 || align=center | M || align=center | 2662
|  || title application
|-
|  || 35009192 || Telangana
|  || 2018 || align=center | M || align=center | 2689
|  || title application
|-
|  || 25006479 || Andhra Pradesh
|  || 2018 || align=center | M || align=center | 2527
|  || title application
|-
|  || 5078776 || Telangana
|  || 2019 || align=center | M || align=center | 2557
|  || title application
|-
|  || 5018226 || Tamil Nadu
|  || 2019 || align=center | M || align=center | 2507
|  || title application
|-
|  || 5029104 || Karnataka
|  || 2019 || align=center | M || align=center | 2527
|  || title application
|-
|  || 25012223 || Tamil Nadu
|  || 2019 || align=center | M || align=center | 2542
|  || title application
|-
|  || 46616543 || Tamil Nadu
|  || 2019 || align=center | M || align=center | 2699
|  || title application
|-
|  || 25002767 || Tamil Nadu
|  || 2019 || align=center | M || align=center | 2556
|  || title application
|-
|  || 5028183 || Odisha
|  || 2019 || align=center | M || align=center | 2503
|  || title application
|-
|  || 5038448 || Karnataka
|  || 2019 || align=center | M || align=center | 2506
|  || title application
|-
|  || 46618546 || Delhi
|  || 2019 || align=center | M || align=center | 2501
|  || title application
|-
|  || 35093487 || Maharashtra
|  || 2019 || align=center | M || align=center | 2622
|  || title application
|-
|  || 5040299 || Tamil Nadu
|  || 2020 || align=center | M || align=center | 2500
|  || title application
|-
|  || 35028561 || Goa
|  || 2020 || align=center | M || align=center | 2571
|  || title application
|-
|  || 35018701 || Tamil Nadu
|  || 2021 || align=center | M || align=center | 2537
|  || title application
|-
|  || 5089000 || Maharashtra
|  || 2021 || align=center | M || align=center | 2501
|  || title application
|-
|  || 35007394 || Telangana
|  || 2021 || align=center | M || align=center | 2502
|  || title application
|-
|  || 5057000 || West Bengal
|  || 2021 || align=center | M || align=center | 2512
|  || title application
|-
|  || 5097010 || Maharashtra
|  || 2021 || align=center | M || align=center | 2536
|  || title application
|-
|  || 46634827 || Tamil Nadu
|  || 2022 || align=center | M || align=center | 2508
|  || title application
|-
|  || 25059653 || Telangana
|  || 2022 || align=center | M || align=center | 2506
|  || title application
|-
|  || 25060783 || Tamil Nadu
|  || 2022 || align=center | M || align=center | 2519
|  || [- title application]

International Masters

{| class="wikitable nowrap sortable static-row-numbers"
! Name
! FIDE ID
! State
! Birth
! Year
! M/F
! Highest Rating
! Achieved
! class="unsortable"|Reference
|-
|  || 5000092 || Tamil Nadu
|  || 1961 || align=center | M || align=center | 2415
|  || 
|-
|  || 5090598 || Goa
|  || 2015 || align=center | M || align=center | 2440
|  || title application
|-
|  || 5092442 || Tamil Nadu
|  || 2018 || align=center | M || align=center | 2427
|  || title application
|-
|  || 5027330 || Karnataka
|  || 2016 || align=center | M || align=center | 2435
|  || title application
|-
|  || 25034430 || Goa
|  || 2020 || align=center | M || align=center | 2410
|  || title application
|-
|  || 25059009 || Tamil Nadu
|  || 2020 || align=center | M || align=center | 2411
|  || title application
|-
|  || 5001285 || Tamil Nadu
|  || 1999 || align=center | M || align=center | 2480
|  || 
|-
|  || 5000068 || Tamil Nadu
|  || 1992 || align=center | M || align=center | 2445
|  || 
|-
|  || 5045150 || Delhi
|  || 2017 || align=center | M || align=center | 2411
|  || title application
|-
|  || 5002761 || West Bengal
|  || 2002 || align=center | M || align=center | 2445
|  || 
|-
|  || 5024803 || West Bengal
|  || 2018 || align=center | M || align=center | 2427
|  || title application
|-
|  || 5007372 || Tamil Nadu
|  || 2010 || align=center | M || align=center | 2421
|  || title application
|-
|  || 5027420 || Andhra Pradesh
|  || 2019 || align=center | M || align=center | 2426
|  || title application
|-
|  || 25073060 || West Bengal
|  || 2019 || align=center | M || align=center | 2449
|  || title application
|-
|  || 5003610 || West Bengal
|  || 2008 || align=center | M || align=center | 2493
|  || title application
|-
|  || 5034426 || West Bengal
|  || 2013 || align=center | M || align=center | 2456
|  || title application
|-
|  || 35026763 || West Bengal
|  || 2018 || align=center | M || align=center | 2396
|  || title application
|-
|  || 5000564 || Maharashtra
|  || 1999 || align=center | M || align=center | 2430
|  || 
|-
|  || 25005812 || Andhra Pradesh
|  || 2017 || align=center | M || align=center | 2441
|  || title application
|-
|  || 25064967 || Gujarat
|  || 2019 || align=center | M || align=center | 2399
|  || title application
|-
|  || 5028280 || Andhra Pradesh
|  || 2018 || align=center | M || align=center | 2409
|  || title application
|-
|  || 25072846 || West Bengal
|  || 2019 || align=center | M || align=center | 2436
|  || title application
|-
|  || 5000572 || Andhra Pradesh
|  || 2004 || align=center | M || align=center | 2448
|  || 
|-
|  || 5012660 || Andhra Pradesh
|  || 2007 || align=center | M || align=center | 2491
|  || title application
|-
|  || 5001315 || Maharashtra
|  || 2002 || align=center | M || align=center | 2411
|  || 
|-
|  || 5057000 || West Bengal
|  || 2019 || align=center | M || align=center | 2448
|  || title application
|-
|  || 5097010 || Maharashtra
|  || 2019 || align=center | M || align=center | 2429
|  || title application
|-
|  || 5033861 || Chandigarh
|  || 2017 || align=center | M || align=center | 2461
|  || title application
|-
|  || 5000254 || Karnataka
|  || 1988 || align=center | M || align=center | 2420
|  || 
|-
|  || 5006775 || Tamil Nadu
|  || 2018 || align=center | M || align=center | 2463
|  || title application
|-
|  || 5070147 || Telangana
|  || 2019 || align=center | M || align=center | 2404
|  || title application
|-
|  || 5084822 || Odisha
|  || 2017 || align=center | M || align=center | 2435
|  || title application
|-
|  || 5000041 || Tamil Nadu
|  || 1988 || align=center | M || align=center | 2460
|  || 
|-
|  || 5005507 || Kerala
|  || 2007 || align=center | M || align=center | 2488
|  || title application
|-
|  || 35018701 || Tamil Nadu
|  || 2018 || align=center | M || align=center | 2484
|  || title application
|-
|  || 5012600 || Maharashtra
|  || 2010 || align=center | F || align=center | 2425
|  || title application
|-
|  || 5024498 || Maharashtra
|  || 2014 || align=center | M || align=center | 2398
|  || title application
|-
|  || 5019257 || Maharashtra
|  || 2015 || align=center | M || align=center | 2403
|  || title application
|-
|  || 5016541 || Madhya Pradesh
|  || 2011 || align=center | M || align=center | 2415
|  || title application
|-
|  || 5006180 || Uttar Pradesh
|  || 2015 || align=center | M || align=center | 2086
|  || 
|-
|  || 5026415 || Maharashtra
|  || 2011 || align=center | M || align=center | 2405
|  || title application
|-
|  || 5000548 || Tamil Nadu
|  || 1995 || align=center | M || align=center | 2463
|  || 
|-
|  || 5018625 || Andhra Pradesh
|  || 2015 || align=center | M || align=center | 2481
|  || title application
|-
|  || 25041142 || Maharashtra
|  || 2020 || align=center | M || align=center | 2410
|  || title application
|-
|  || 5019516 || Goa
|  || 2019 || align=center | F || align=center | 2429
|  || title application
|-
|  || 5037077 || Maharashtra
|  || 2018 || align=center | M || align=center | 2390
|  || title application
|-
|  || 5009847 || Maharashtra
|  || 2007 || align=center | M || align=center | 2465
|  || title application
|-
|  || 5006520 || Maharashtra
|  || 2017 || align=center | M || align=center | 2356
|  ||
|-
|  || 5002818 || West Bengal
|  || 2000 || align=center | M || align=center | 2426
|  || 
|-
|  || 35028600 || Tamil Nadu
|  || 2020 || align=center | M || align=center | 2437
|  || title application
|-
|  || 25043153 || Tamil Nadu
|  || 2016 || align=center | M || align=center | 2401
|  || title application
|-
|  || 46664521 || Telangana
|  || 2019 || align=center | M || align=center | 2462
|  || title application
|-
|  || 5000106 || Jharkhand
|  || 1991 || align=center | M || align=center | 2405
|  || 
|-
|  || 35042025 || Maharashtra
|  || 2019 || align=center | M || align=center | 2461
|  || title application
|-
|  || 5028698 || Odisha
|  || 2017 || align=center | M || align=center | 2404
|  || title application
|-
|  || 5004330 || West Bengal
|  || 2010 || align=center | F || align=center | 2416
|  || title application
|-
|  || 5006040 || Maharashtra
|  || 2003 || align=center | M || align=center | 2411
|  || 
|-
|  || 35080350 || Maharashtra
|  || 2019 || align=center | M || align=center | 2399
|  || title application
|-
|  || 5000122 || Tamil Nadu
|  || 1982 || align=center | M || align=center | 2410
|  || 
|-
|  || 25009141 || Maharashtra
|  || 2019 || align=center | M || align=center | 2394
|  || title application
|-
|  || 25089544 || Delhi
|  || 2018 || align=center | M || align=center | 2510
|  || title application
|-
|  || 5015294 || Tamil Nadu
|  || 2014 || align=center | M || align=center | 2408
|  || title application
|-
|  || 5018277 || Tamil Nadu
|  || 2010 || align=center | M || align=center | 2461
|  || 
|-
|  || 25059653 || Telangana
|  || 2018 || align=center | M || align=center | 2474
|  || title application
|-
|  || 5018382 || Tamil Nadu
|  || 2018 || align=center | M || align=center | 2396
|  || title application
|-
|  || 5010454 || West Bengal
|  || 2010 || align=center | M || align=center | 2449
|  || title application
|-
|  || 5006848 || Gujarat
|  || 2007 || align=center | M || align=center | 2411
|  || title application
|-
|  || 5094798 || West Bengal
|  || 2019 || align=center | M || align=center | 2383
|  ||
|-
|  || 5000050 || Others
|  || 1986 || align=center | M || align=center | 2480
|  || 
|-
|  || 35007394 || Telangana
|  || 2018 || align=center | M || align=center | 2443
|  || title application
|-
|  || 5026598 || Tamil Nadu
|  || 2010 || align=center | M || align=center | 2431
|  || title application
|-
|  || 5081483 || Tamil Nadu
|  || 2018 || align=center | M || align=center | 2448
|  || title application
|-
|  || 5089000 || Maharashtra
|  || 2017 || align=center | M || align=center | 2482
|  || title application
|-
|  || 5029317 || Tamil Nadu
|  || 2012 || align=center | M || align=center | 2419
|  || title application
|-
|  || 5001277 || Tamil Nadu
|  || 2005 || align=center | M || align=center | 2408
|  || title application
|-
|  || 5022401 || Maharashtra
|  || 2010 || align=center | M || align=center | 2477
|  || title application
|-
|  || 35046977 || Uttrakhand
|  || 2020 || align=center | M || align=center | 2480
|  || title application
|-
|  || 5000084 || Andhra Pradesh
|  || 1987 || align=center | M || align=center | 2462
|  || 
|-
|  || 5017220 || Andhra Pradesh
|  || 2015 || align=center | M || align=center | 2470
|  || title application
|-
|  || 5010535 || Tamil Nadu
|  || 2010 || align=center | M || align=center | 2463
|  || title application
|-
|  || 25009532 || Telangana
|  || 2014 || align=center | M || align=center | 2443
|  || 
|-
|  || 5029295 || Odisha
|  || 2015 || align=center | F || align=center | 2454
|  || title application
|-
|  || 5035120 || West Bengal
|  || 2016 || align=center | M || align=center | 2405
|  || title application
|-
|  || 5001781 || West Bengal
|  || 1999 || align=center | M || align=center | 2353
|  ||
|-
|  || 5000130 || Tamil Nadu
|  || 1994 || align=center | M || align=center | 2460
|  || 
|-
|  || 5009120 || Tamil Nadu
|  || 2003 || align=center | M || align=center | 2425
|  || 
|-
|  || 25002112 || Tamil Nadu
|  || 2019 || align=center | M || align=center | 2445
|  || title application
|-
|  || 5000238 || Tamil Nadu
|  || 2002 || align=center | M || align=center | 2400
|  || 
|-
|  || 5007038 || Karnataka
|  || 2011 || align=center | M || align=center | 2467
|  || title application
|-
|  || 5007844 || Delhi
|  || 2007 || align=center | F || align=center | 2443
|  || title application
|-
|  || 5094160 || West Bengal
|  || 2019 || align=center | M || align=center | 2413
|  || title application
|-
|  || 5002532 || West Bengal
|  || 2005 || align=center | M || align=center | 2419
|  || title application
|-
|  || 5000157 || Odisha
|  || 1992 || align=center | M || align=center | 2425
|  || 
|-
|  || 5013615 || Delhi
|  || 2010 || align=center | M || align=center | 2406
|  || title application
|-
|  || 5000599 || Delhi
|  || 2005 || align=center | M || align=center | 2409
|  || 
|-
|  || 25007963 || West Bengal
|  || 2019 || align=center | M || align=center | 2406
|  ||
|-
|  || 5004306 || Odisha
|  || 2002 || align=center | M || align=center | 2480
|  || 
|-
|  || 5000076 || Tamil Nadu
|  || 1981 || align=center | M || align=center | 2430
|  || 
|-
|  || 5019850 || Gujarat
|  || 2018 || align=center | M || align=center | 2411
|  || title application
|-
|  || 5022509 || Maharashtra
|  || 2014 || align=center | M || align=center | 2468
|  || title application
|-
|  || 5053196 || Maharashtra
|  || 2016 || align=center | M || align=center | 2449
|  || title application
|-
|  || 5004110 || Uttar Pradesh
|  || 2002 || align=center | M || align=center | 2441
|  || 
|-
|  || 5025842 || Delhi
|  || 2017 || align=center | M || align=center | 2399
|  || title application
|-
|  || 5073421 || Maharashtra
|  || 2020 || align=center | M || align=center | 2432
|  || title application
|-
|  || 5000513 || Maharashtra
|  || 1996 || align=center | M || align=center | 2405
|  || 
|-
|  || 35070924 || Madhya Pradesh
|  || 2019 || align=center | M || align=center | 2390
|  || title application
|-
|  || 5024218 || Tamil Nadu
|  || 2010 || align=center | M || align=center | 2502
|  || title application
|-
|  || 5007780 || Tamil Nadu
|  || 2006 || align=center | M || align=center | 2523
|  || title application
|-
|  || 25004964 || Karnataka
|  || 2016 || align=center | M || align=center | 2451
|  || title application
|-
|  || 46634827 || Tamil Nadu
|  || 2019 || align=center | M || align=center | 2437
|  || title application
|-
|  || 5016193 || Maharashtra
|  || 2019 || align=center | F || align=center | 2428
|  || title application
|-
|  || 5004977 || Tamil Nadu
|  || 2008 || align=center | M || align=center | 2445
|  || title application
|-
|  || 5001498 || Andhra Pradesh
|  || 2015 || align=center | M || align=center | 2406
|  || 
|-
|  || 5000165 || Maharashtra
|  || 1987 || align=center | M || align=center | 2415
|  || 
|-
|  || 5021740 || Maharashtra
|  || 2011 || align=center | M || align=center | 2444
|  || title application
|-
|  || 5028949 || Odisha
|  || 2010 || align=center | M || align=center | 2435
|  || title application
|-
|  || 5000149 || Tamil Nadu
|  || 1978 || align=center | M || align=center | 2415
|  || 
|-
|  || 5000580 || Tamil Nadu
|  || 1994 || align=center | M || align=center | 2435
|  || 
|-
|  || 5028876 || Chhattisgarh
|  || 2019 || align=center | M || align=center | 2437
|  || title application
|-
|  || 5000246 || Maharashtra
|  || 1985 || align=center | M || align=center | 2385
|  || 
|-
|  || 5000114 || Pondicherry
|  || 1993 || align=center | M || align=center | 2425
|  || 
|-
|  || 25012215 || Tamil Nadu
|  || 2015 || align=center | M || align=center | 2486
|  || title application
|-
|  || 5985434 || Maharashtra
|  || 2020 || align=center | M || align=center | 2304
|  || title application
|-
|  || 5013291 || Kerala
|  || 2021 || align=center | M || align=center | 2394
|  || title application
|-
|  || 25095927 || Tamil Nadu
|  || 2021 || align=center | M || align=center | 2383
|  || title application

Woman Grandmasters

{| class="wikitable nowrap sortable static-row-numbers"
! Name
! FIDE ID
! State
! Birth
! Year
! Highest Rating
! Achieved
! class="unsortable"|Reference
|-
|  || 5000629 || Andhra Pradesh
|  || 2020 || align=center | 2346
|  || title application
|-
|  || 5003474 || Maharashtra
|  || 2004 || align=center | 2385
|  || 
|-
|  || 5013623 || West Bengal
|  || 2008 || align=center | 2423
|  || title application
|-
|  || 5012600 || Maharashtra
|  || 2005 || align=center | 2425
|  || title application
|-
|  || 5019516 || Goa
|  || 2012 || align=center | 2429
|  || title application
|-
|  || 5004381 || Tamil Nadu
|  || 2004 || align=center | 2357
|  || 
|-
|  || 5019575 || Orissa
|  || 2010 || align=center | 2316
|  || title application
|-
|  || 5004330 || West Bengal
|  || 2003 || align=center | 2416
|  || 
|-
|  || 5012716 || Maharashtra
|  || 2009 || align=center | 2387
|  || title application
|-
|  || 5050847 || Tamil Nadu
|  || 2019 || align=center | 2365
|  || title application
|-
|  || 5004373 || Tamil Nadu
|  || 2003 || align=center | 2348
|  || title application
|-
|  || 5091756 || Tamil Nadu
|  || 2018 || align=center | 2411
|  || title application
|-
|  || 5029295 || Orissa
|  || 2010 || align=center | 2454
|  || title application
|-
|  || 5007844 || Delhi
|  || 2005 || align=center | 2443
|  || title application
|-
|  || 5055903 || Tamil Nadu
|  || 2019 || align=center | 2306
|  || title application
|-
|  || 5016193 || Maharashtra
|  || 2008 || align=center | 2428
|  || title application
|-
|  || 5091241 || Tamil Nadu
|  || 2019 || align=center | 2271
|  || title application
|-
|  || 5004098 || Tamil Nadu
|  || 2001 || align=center | 2485
|  ||

Woman International Masters

{| class="wikitable nowrap sortable static-row-numbers"
! Name
! FIDE ID
! State
! Birth
! Year
! Highest Rating
! Achieved
! class="unsortable"|Reference
|-
|  || 25050389 || Delhi
|  || 2017 || align=center | 2314
|  || title application
|-
|  || 5018218 || Tamil Nadu
|  || 2013 || align=center | 2030
|  || 
|-
|  || 5005736 || Tamil Nadu
|  || 2015 || align=center | 2263
|  || title application
|-
|  || 5056535 || West Bengal
|  || 2017 || align=center | 2124
|  ||
|-
|  || 35002899 || Maharashtra
|  || 2015 || align=center | 2279
|  || 
|-
|  || 5045118 || Telangana
|  || 2019 || align=center | 2235
|  || title application
|-
|  || 5019834 || Gujarat
|  || 2012 || align=center | 2205
|  || title application
|-
|  || 25096990 || Maharashtra
|  || 2019 || align=center | 2256
|  ||
|-
|  || 35006916 || Maharashtra
|  || 2018 || align=center | 2431
|  || title application
|-
|  || 5001331 || West Bengal
|  || 2000 || align=center | 2248
|  || 
|-
|  || 5043131 || Maharashtra
|  || 2014 || align=center | 2275
|  || 
|-
|  || 5048400 || Goa
|  || 2012 || align=center | 2277
|  || 
|-
|  || 5038650 || Maharashtra
|  || 2009 || align=center | 2165
|  || title application
|-
|  || 5001005 || Maharashtra
|  || 1985 || align=center | 2253
|  || 
|-
|  || 25043250 || Andhra Pradesh
|  || 2019 || align=center | 2182
|  ||
|-
|  || 25014510 || Maharashtra
|  || 2016 || align=center | 2334
|  || 
|-
|  || 5009936 || Tamil Nadu
|  || 2015 || align=center | 2295
|  || title application
|-
|  || 5082986 || Tamil Nadu
|  || 2019 || align=center | 2218
|  || title application
|-
|  || 5014034 || Tamil Nadu
|  || 2002 || align=center | 2198
|  || 
|-
|  || 5001030 || Maharashtra
|  || 1979 || align=center | 2120
|  || 
|-
|  || 5000882 || Maharashtra
|  || 1984 || align=center | 2220
|  || 
|-
|  || 5001021 || Maharashtra
|  || 1982 || align=center | 2135
|  || 
|-
|  || 5019354 || Tamil Nadu
|  || 2012 || align=center | 2215
|  || title application
|-
|  || 5001684 || Maharashtra
|  || 2000 || align=center | 2205
|  || 
|-
|  || 5018650 || Andhra Pradesh
|  || 2007 || align=center | 2166
|  || 
|-
|  || 5001080 || Tamil Nadu
|  || 2015 || align=center | 2255
|  || 
|-
|  || 25011944 || Maharashtra
|  || 2019 || align=center | 2245
|  || title application
|-
|  || 5004357 || Tamil Nadu
|  || 2007 || align=center | 2227
|  || title application
|-
|  || 5056403 || West Bengal
|  || 2019 || align=center | 2290
|  || title application
|-
|  || 5015448 || Andhra Pradesh
|  || 2005 || align=center | 2268
|  || title application
|-
|  || 5017173 || Tamil Nadu
|  || 2013 || align=center | 2290
|  || title application
|-
|  || 5013550 || Tamil Nadu
|  || 2008 || align=center | 2208
|  || title application
|-
|  || 25049615 || Andhra Pradesh
|  || 2018 || align=center | 2313
|  || title application
|-
|  || 5024528 || Maharashtra
|  || 2017 || align=center | 2268
|  || title application
|-
|  || 25073230 || Tamil Nadu
|  || 2019 || align=center | 2322
|  || title application
|-
|  || 5001056 || Karnataka
|  || 1990 || align=center | 2235
|  || 
|-
|  || 5054290 || Gujarat
|  || 2016 || align=center | 2310
|  || title application
|-
|  || 5085527 || Maharashtra
|  || 2018 || align=center | 2308
|  || title application
|-
|  || 5003547 || Maharashtra
|  || 1999 || align=center | 2230
|  || 
|-
|  || 35006665 || Karnataka
|  || 2019 || align=center | 2276
|  || title application
|-
|  || 5001013 || Maharashtra
|  || 1986 || align=center | 2335
|  || 
|-
|  || 5009871 || Tamil Nadu
|  || 2003 || align=center | 2231
|  ||

See also
 Chess in India
 List of chess grandmasters
 List of female chess players

References

External links
 Top Indian Players - FIDE List
 All India Chess Federation Player Search

 
Chess
India